Max Archimowitz (26 February 1920 – 15 November 2000) was a German politician from the Social Democratic Party of Germany. He was a member of the Landtag of North Rhine-Westphalia from 1956 to 1958, from 1962 to 1966 and from 1969 to 1970.

References

1920 births
2000 deaths
People from the Free City of Danzig
Members of the Landtag of North Rhine-Westphalia
Social Democratic Party of Germany politicians